Parley is a discussion conference.

Parley or variant, may also refer to:

Places
 Parley Lake, Carver County, Minnesota, USA
 Parleys Canyon, Utah, USA
 Parley's Trail, Salt Lake County, Utah, USA
 Parley Common, Ferndown, Dorset, Hampshire, England, UK

People

Surname
 Peter Parley (1793–1869), U.S. author
 Alexander Parley Johnson, namesake of the Casa de Parley Johnson, Downey, California, USA

Given name
 Parley Baer (1914–2002), U.S. actor
 Parley Davis, namesake of the Parley Davis House, East Montpelier, Vermont, USA
 Parley Gulbrandsen (1889–1959), Norwegian missionary
 Parley G. Hellewell (born 1950), U.S. politician
 Parley Hunt, namesake of the Parley Hunt House, Bunkerville, Nevada, USA
 Parley P. Pratt (1807–1857), a Mormon leader

Other uses
 Adidas Parley, the Parley clothing collection from Adidas

See also

 East Parley, Hurn, Dorset, Hampshire, England, UK
 West Parley, Dorset, Hampshire, England, UK
 Parley for the Oceans, a non-profit NGO for oceanic environmental proection
 Parley Voo (disambiguation)
 Parlez vous (disambiguation)
 
 Parlay (disambiguation)
 Parle (disambiguation)
 Parler (disambiguation)
 Parly